Domingos Antônio da Guia  (born in Rio de Janeiro, November 19, 1912 – died in Rio, May 18, 2000) was a Brazilian footballer.

He played in four matches for Brazil in the 1938 FIFA World Cup finals. He is regarded as one of the best Brazilian defenders of all time.

Honours

Copa Río Branco: 1931, 1932
Uruguayan League: 1933
Rio de Janeiro State League: 1934, 1939, 1942, 1943
Argentine League: 1935
Roca Cup: 1945

Individual
FIFA World Cup All-Star Team: 1938
South American Championship Player of the tournament: 1945

References

External links
 

1912 births
2000 deaths
Footballers from Rio de Janeiro (city)
Brazilian footballers
Brazil international footballers
Bangu Atlético Clube players
CR Flamengo footballers
Club Nacional de Football players
Boca Juniors footballers
Sport Club Corinthians Paulista players
CR Vasco da Gama players
Brazilian expatriate footballers
Expatriate footballers in Argentina
Expatriate footballers in Uruguay
Brazilian expatriate sportspeople in Argentina
Brazilian expatriate sportspeople in Uruguay
1938 FIFA World Cup players
Argentine Primera División players
Association football defenders